Gloria is a South Korean television series starring Bae Doona, Lee Chun-hee, Seo Ji-seok, So Yi-hyun, Oh Hyun-kyung and Lee Jong-won in a tale of romance, survival, overcoming poverty and adversity, and making your dreams come true. It aired on MBC from July 31, 2010 to January 30, 2011 on Saturdays and Sundays at 20:40 for 50 episodes.

Plot 
After their parents were killed in a car accident, Na Jin-jin (Bae Doona) has lived with her mentally handicapped older sister Na Jin-joo (Oh Hyun-kyung), whom she has supported from a young age. Jin-jin barely ekes out a living juggling a series of dead-end part-time jobs, including delivering newspapers and running a nightclub coat check. One day, the nightclub's regular singer doesn't show up and when Jin-jin is asked to fill in, she performs an impromptu version of Laura Branigan's "Gloria." Jin-jin becomes consumed with the idea of becoming a nightclub singer and sees it as her only hope to escape her humdrum life, saying that she only feels alive when she's onstage.

Jin-jin grew up with Ha Dong-ah (Lee Chun-hee), who has remained her loyal friend through everything, as he himself raises his young nephew. But Dong-ah, a gifted fighter, turns to a life in the mob.

Lee Kang-suk (Seo Ji-seok), the illegitimate son of a wealthy family and president of a record label, begins pursuing Jin-jin, while suicidal ex-ballet dancer Jung Yoon-seo (So Yi-hyun) catches Dong-ah's eye.

Cast 
Na family
Bae Doona as Na Jin-jin
Lee Ji-eun as young Jin-jin
Oh Hyun-kyung as Na Jin-joo (Jin-jin's older sister)

Ha family
Lee Chun-hee as Ha Dong-ah
Chun Bo-geun as Ha Eo-jin (Dong-ah's nephew)
Han Jin-hee as Ha Man-soo (Dong-ah's father)

Lee family
Seo Ji-seok as Lee Kang-suk
Lee Jong-won as Lee Ji-suk (Kang-suk's half brother)
Yeon Kyu-jin as Lee Joon-ho (Kang-suk and Ji-suk's father)
Sung Byung-sook as Ms. Song (Ji-suk's mother)

Jung family
So Yi-hyun as Jung Yoon-seo
Kim Ki-hyun as President Jung (Yoon-seo's father)
Jung So-nyeo as Yoon-seo's mother

Nightclub
Na Young-hee as Yeo Jung-nan (former singer, Kang-suk's mother)
Lee Young-ha as Jung Woo-hyun (nightclub owner)
Choi Jae-hwan as Park Dong-chul (waiter)
Ha Yeon-joo as Yoo Mi-na (female backup singer)
Jo Hyang-ki as Tae-soon (female backup singer)

Double Sharp Entertainment 
Park Hyun-sook as Choi Ji-young (talent agency director)
Lee Sang-woo as vocal coach

Extended cast
Kim Young-ok as Oh Soon-nyeo
Lee Sung-min as Son Jong-bum
Kim Byung-choon as Lee Yoon-bae
Lee Jong-bak as Dae-bak
ZE:A as singer trainees
Moon Joon-young as Singer trainee
Min Joon-hyun

Awards and nominations

References

External links 
 Gloria official MBC website 
 Gloria at MBC Global Media
 
 

MBC TV television dramas
2010 South Korean television series debuts
2011 South Korean television series endings
Korean-language television shows
South Korean romance television series
South Korean musical television series